Tegeticula californica is a moth of the family Prodoxidae. It is found along the coast of southernmost California, United States.

The wingspan is 23.4-25.5 mm for males and 27.5–30 mm for females. The forewings are white with a narrow band of dark brown scales. The hindwings are brownish gray. Adults are on wing in April.

The larvae feed on Yucca schidigera.

Etymology
The species epithet refers to the California cismontane floristic region which contains the known sites of the species.

References

External links

Prodoxidae
Moths of North America
Fauna of the California chaparral and woodlands
Moths described in 2008